Saint Vincent and the Grenadines competed at the 1992 Summer Olympics in Barcelona, Spain. They used six track and field athletes.

Competitors
The following is the list of number of competitors in the Games.

Athletics

Men

Women

See also
Saint Vincent and the Grenadines at the 1991 Pan American Games

References

Official Olympic Reports
sports-reference

Nations at the 1992 Summer Olympics
1992
Olympics